William George Chard (1812 - September 19, 1877) was a California pioneer.

Life
William George Chard was born in Columbia County, New York in 1812.  He came to California via New Mexico with trappers Cyrus Alexander and Lemuel Carpenter, arriving in Los Angeles in 1832.  He travelled to Santa Barbara, and Monterey.  Chard married Maria Esteven Robles (1823–1871) in 1837.  In 1844, he was granted the Rancho Las Flores Mexican land grant in present-day Tehama County, California.  Chard was Superintendent of the New Almaden quicksilver mine south of San Jose until 1846.

He died September 19, 1877.

References

External links
tigger.uic.edu

1812 births
1877 deaths
People from Columbia County, New York
People from Tehama County, California